Conradie is a surname. Notable people with the surname include:

Bolla Conradie (born 1978), South African rugby union footballer
J. H. Conradie (1897–1966), South African politician, advocate and judge
Louis Conradie (born 1996), South African rugby union player
Pieter Conradie (born 1994), South African sprinter
Wian Conradie (born 1994), Namibian rugby union player